Les Faucheurs de marguerites  is a French-Canadian-German television series.  It ran in four seasons from 1974 to 1982 on ARD.

Cast
 Jean-Jacques Moreau : Gabriel Voisin
 Roger Pigaut : Capitaine Ferber
 Jackie Sardou : Madame Perrier
 Bruno Pradal : Edouard Dabert
 Christine Wodetzky : Jeanne Dabert
 Joachim Hansen : Lilienthal
 Gernot Endemann : Hans

See also
List of German television series

External links
 

1974 German television series debuts
1982 German television series endings
1970s French television series
1980s French television series
1974 French television series debuts
1982 French television series endings
Aviation television series